Get Low may refer to:

Film and television
 Get Low (film), a 2009 film starring Robert Duvall and Bill Murray

Music
Labels
 Get Low Recordz, a San Francisco-based independent record label
 Get Low Records, a hip hop record label

Albums
 Get Low (album), a 2009 album by Romeo

Songs
 "Get Low" (Lil Jon & the East Side Boyz song), 2003
 "Get Low" (Waka Flocka Flame song), 2012
 "Get Low" (Dillon Francis and DJ Snake song), 2014 was played in Fast and Furious 7.
 "Get Low" (50 Cent song), 2015
 "Get Low" (Zedd and Liam Payne song), 2017
 "Get Low", a song by Lloyd Banks from the Get Rich or Die Tryin soundtrack
 "Get Low", a song by Stat Quo from Eminem Presents: The Re-Up

See also
 Gitlow v. New York, a landmark United States Supreme Court case